Palnadu is a region located in  Palnadu district and covering a portion of Prakasam district in Andhra Pradesh, India. It is spread over the revenue divisions of Gurazala in Palnadu district and Markapur in Prakasam district.

History 
The region is most notable for the Battle of Palnadu that was fought under the leadership of Brahma Nayadu and Nagamma and their warriors.

In January 2020, the Government of Andhra Pradesh approved making the region a district. Narasaraopet and Gurazala were purported to be the choices for the district headquarters.

Geography 
The region comprises hills and mostly stony areas which has minerals such as limestone and granite. Narasaraopet in Guntur district is considered as 'Gateway of Palnadu'.

References 

Sub regions of Andhra Pradesh
Coastal Andhra